Lothar Bisky (17 August 1941  13 August 2013) was a German politician. He was the chairman of the Party of Democratic Socialism (PDS), the successor of East Germany's Socialist Unity Party (SED).  In June 2007 he became co-chairman of The Left (Die Linke) party, formed by a merger of the PDS and the much smaller Labour and Social Justice – The Electoral Alternative. From 2007 until 2010 he was the President of the Party of the European Left. Also, he was the Publisher of the socialist newspaper Neues Deutschland.

Background
Bisky was born in Zollbrück, Pomerania, Germany (now Korzybie, Pomeranian Voivodeship, Poland), from where he came after 1945 as refugee to Schleswig-Holstein in northern West Germany. In order to get a free university education he emigrated to Communist GDR at the age of 18, and after facing initial doubts due to his heritage was allowed to join the Socialist Unity Party in 1963, but did not rise to leadership positions until shortly after the fall of communism and the resulting purge of hardliners from the party. He was rector of the University of Film and Television (Potsdam-Babelsberg) from 1986 to 1990. In 1991 he became a member of the board of directors of regional television channel ORB (now part of RBB).

Stasi informer
In 1995, it was discovered that Bisky had been an informer for the Stasi. The Stasi records on his wife referred to his activities as an informant. Subsequent investigations revealed that Bisky was registered by the Stasi with the code names of Bienert between 1966 and 1970, and as  Klaus Heine from 1987.

When Bisky was promoted, the Main Directorate for Reconnaissance of the Stasi issued a statement where Bisky was described as "a reliable comrade, who strictly follows orders and always is honest with the Ministry for State Security (Stasi)".

Political career
In 1990 he was a member of the Volkskammer and beginning in 1990 he was a member of the state parliament in Brandenburg.

He was chairman of the PDS from 1993 until his resignation in 2000 over a defeat for the executive committee on support for United Nations military intervention. He was re-elected chairman in 2003 after this "left turn" had cost the party its seats in the Bundestag in 2002. Bisky was seen to be on the moderate, social democratic wing of the party and was a long-time close ally of the party's most prominent figure, Gregor Gysi. He was often regarded for his abilities to lead meaningful discussions between parties of completely opposite viewpoints, be it within his own party or in media events with other groups.

The party returned strongly to the Bundestag in the 2005 election. Bisky, one of 54 Left MPs, was nominated by his party to become one of the six vice presidents of the Bundestag. When the new Bundestag was constituted on 18 October, however, he failed three times to be elected. Several MPs explained this with the fact that he was an informant of the Stasi. Later, he failed a fourth time, and subsequently gave up his bid for the vice president position which was given to Petra Pau instead.

Personal life
Lothar Bisky was married and the father of three sons. His oldest son, Jens Bisky, is a journalist and writer and the second-oldest, Norbert Bisky, is a painter. His youngest son, Stephan Bisky, died in late 2008 while working towards his neuro-informatics doctorate at the University of Edinburgh.

He died in a hospital in Leipzig as a result of falling down the stairs in his apartment in August 2013.

References

External links

 Biography of party Die Linke Brandenburg
 Will Germany Go Left of the Left? by Markus Deggerich, Der Spiegel, Sept 25 2009
 FAZ: Nachruf (obituary)

1941 births
2013 deaths
People from Słupsk County
People from the Province of Pomerania
Socialist Unity Party of Germany politicians
Party of Democratic Socialism (Germany) politicians
The Left (Germany) politicians
Leaders of political parties in Germany
People of the Stasi
Members of the Volkskammer
Members of the Bundestag for Brandenburg
Leipzig University alumni
The Left (Germany) MEPs
MEPs for Germany 2009–2014
Members of the Landtag of Brandenburg
Members of the Bundestag 2005–2009
Members of the Bundestag for the Party of Democratic Socialism (Germany)